Leptodactylus is a genus of leptodactylid frogs. It includes the species commonly called ditch frogs or white-lipped frogs. It is very similar to Physalaemus, a close relative, and indeed the 2005 described Leptodactylus lauramiriamae is in some aspects intermediate between them.
The name means ‘slender finger’, from leptos (‘thin, delicate’) and the Greek  (‘finger, toe’).

Species

There are 84 species in this genus:

Footnotes

References
  (2005): Leptodactylus lauramiriamae, a distinctive new species of frog (Amphibia: Anura: Leptodactylidae) from Rondônia, Brazil. Proceedings of the Biological Society of Washington 118(3): 590–595. DOI: 10.2988/0006-324X(2005)118[590:LLADNS]2.0.CO;2 HTML abstract

External links

 
Amphibian genera
Amphibians of Central America
Amphibians of North America
Amphibians of South America
Amphibians of the Caribbean
Taxa named by Leopold Fitzinger